Helenium campestre is a North American perennial plant in the sunflower family, commonly known as oldfield sneezeweed. It is native to the southeastern United States, in Arkansas and northwestern Louisiana.

Helenium campestre is an perennial herb up to 100 cm (40 inches) tall. One plant can produce as many as 20 flower heads, in branching arrays. The head is spherical or egg-shaped, with sometimes as many as 700 disc florets, each floret yellow near the base but purple or brown towards the tip. There are also 9-15 yellow ray florets. The species grows in ditches, fields, and streambanks.

References

Flora of the Southeastern United States
Plants described in 1903
campestre
Flora without expected TNC conservation status